The Haikou Ring Expressway, designated as G9801, and G1501 until 2017, was a  in Haikou, Hainan, China. Opened on 6 August 2008, it is now part of G98 (Haikou section, connecting the original East-West Expressway). The second phase of the project G9812 (Meilan Airport Interchange-Yanfeng Interchange) was opened to traffic on 21 September 2019.

In July 2022, the G9801 designation was officially removed, along with a number of other ring roads of coastal cities in the NTHS, because Haikou is a coastal city and it would be inefficient to route a brand new expressway into the sea for no reason.

References

Chinese national-level expressways
Expressways in Hainan
Transport in Hainan